My Donkey, My Lover & I is a 2020 French comedy film directed by Caroline Vignal and starring Laure Calamy.

Cast
 Laure Calamy as Antoinette Lapouge
 Benjamin Lavernhe as Vladimir Loubier
 Olivia Côte as Eléonore Loubier
 Marc Fraize as Michel
 Jean-Pierre Martins as Shérif

References

External links
 

2020 films
2020 comedy films
French comedy films
2020s French films